The locomotives of DRG Class 98.10 (Baureihe 98.10 and, unofficially, the Bavarian GtL 4/5) were superheated steam locomotives with the Deutsche Reichsbahn-Gesellschaft.

After the Bavarian GtL 4/4 (Bayerische GtL 4/4) class engines had proved to be very reliable and had all been taken over by the Reichsbahn, it was decided to build further examples of them.

In 1929 Krauss supplied the first five examples of these machines. In 1930 and 1931 there followed further batches of six and ten locomotives respectively. The remaining engines were manufactured by the newly created firm of Krauss-Maffei in 1932 and 1933.

All 45 locomotives of DRG Class 98.10 passed over to the Deutsche Bundesbahn after the Second World War. Their retirement began in 1957 and was complete by 1966.

See also 
 List of Bavarian locomotives and railbuses
 List of DRG locomotives and railbuses

References

98.10
0-8-2T locomotives
98.10
Krauss-Maffei locomotives
Railway locomotives introduced in 1929
Locomotives of Bavaria
Standard gauge locomotives of Germany
Freight locomotives